The fourth season of JAG premiered on CBS on September 22, 1998, and concluded on May 25, 1999. The season, starring David James Elliott and Catherine Bell, was produced by Belisarius Productions in association with Paramount Television.

Plot 
Marine Major Sarah "Mac" MacKenzie (Catherine Bell), a Duke graduate, and Lieutenant Commander Harmon "Harm" Rabb Jr. (David James Elliott), a former naval aviator, work at the Headquarters of the Judge Advocate General, the internal law firm of the Department of the Navy which investigates, prosecutes and defends cases under the Uniform Code of Military Justice (UCMJ). 

This season, Harm and Mac are assumed dead following an altercation with a Russian fighter pilot ("Gypsy Eyes"), however after punching out of their plane before impact, they begin a journey to uncover the truth about Harm's father. Later, Harm and Mac head several investigations including an undercover operation at an embassy ("Embassy"), the suspected rape of a Japanese national ("Innocence"), an escape from a VA hospital ("The Martin Baker Fan Club"), an execution on national television ("Act of Terror"), and a pilot who defied direct orders after hearing the voice of God ("Angels 30"). Meanwhile, Bud (Patrick Labyorteaux) is promoted to Lieutenant ("The Adversaries"), Harriet Sims (Karri Turner) is promoted to Lieutenant J.G. ("Rivers' Run"), Mac's "little sister" Chloe (Mae Whitman) arrives at JAG shortly before Christmas ("Jaggle Bells"), Rear Admiral A.J. Chegwidden (John M. Jackson) rescues his daughter from the Italian Mafia ("Going After Francesca"), and Royal Australian Navy Commander Mic Brumby (Trevor Goddard) arrives in the United States as an exchange officer ("Mr. Rabb Goes to Washington"). Also this season, Harm receives combat orders and departs JAG ("Goodbyes"), Mac and Harm make a pact to have children together ("Yeah, Baby"), and both Clayton Webb (Steven Culp) and Admiral Chegwidden heads to Italy to rescue a common mentor from captivity ("Soul Searching").

Production 
During this season the production team filmed partially on location in Washington, D.C. for scenes for a few episodes with the main characters. By this point, the United States Navy was now enthusiastic about its support to the series, "We treated JAG the way we would any other production," according to Captain Ron Morse at Navy Office of Information West, the Los Angeles-based liaison office with the entertainment industry, "We look at the scripts, the principal characters and how they respond to the situations they're presented." And both Harm and Mac was clearly to their liking, "[t]hey're attractive, smart, dedicated individuals who behave the way naval officers should and know what they're doing." In summation, "[w]e found JAG to reflect well on the Navy."

This season also advertised the National Center for Missing and Exploited Children, while the telephone number 1-800-The-Lost was featured in the closing credits of the season finale, "Goodbyes".

Reception 
During its fourth season, JAG ratings were "up 11 percent in households, 8 percent in adults 18-49 and 10 percent in adults 25-54" when compared to the third season, positioning the series as the fourteenth most watched show in household ratings in the United States. 

Michael Kilian in Chicago Tribune opined that at this point in the series, in contrast to JAGs first more action oriented season, "the scripts have become much more intelligent and the stories more realistic, sophisticated and personal" and that the series had "carved itself a niche in the viewing audience" as the "numerous fan Internet sites attest."

Cast and characters

Main

Also starring

Recurring

Episodes

See also
 1998–99 United States network television schedule

Notes

References

External links 
 Season 4 on IMDb
 Season 4 on TV.com
 Season 4 on TV Guide

04
1998 American television seasons
1999 American television seasons